Mesogramma is a genus of flowering plants belonging to the family Asteraceae. It contains a single species, Mesogramma apiifolium.

Its native range is Southern Tropical and Southern Africa.

References

Senecioneae